Guevara Al-Budayri Isaac Ahmad Al-Budayri (Arabic: جيفارا البديري) (born in Jerusalem year 1976) a Palestinian reporter, who reports from the west bank for Al Jazeera channel. She has a bachelor's degree in Journalism and Media from Yarmouk University in Jordan. 

She was arrested by the Israeli forces in June 5,2021 while covering a sit-in in Sheikh Jarrah neighborhood, Jerusalem. She was violently assaulted and arrested along with the photographer Nabil Mazzawi, who worked with her, she got released on the same day by the Israeli police, with the prevention from entering the Sheikh Jarrah neighborhood for 15 days.

Personal life 
Daughter of the Jerulastic lawyer and journalist Isaaq Ahmed Al-Budayri, director of the orient house, and her mother Mrs. Hedaya Al-Kazemi, president of the Arab Women's Union Association in Jerusalem, and her siblings the journalist and media figure Ahmed Al-Budayri and lawyer Oruba Al-Budayri. Married to the dentist Fouad Al-Muthaffar, and have two daughters, one of them is called Raya.

References 

1976 births 
Palestinian reporters and correspondents
Living people
Palestinian women journalists
Yarmouk University alumni
Journalists from Jerusalem